The Mokama–Barauni section connects  and Barauni Junction in the Indian state of Bihar.

The Howrah–Delhi main line on the southern side of the Ganges was opened to through traffic in 1866 and the railway lines on the northern side of the Ganges also came up in the subsequent years of the nineteenth century.

The -long Munger Ganga Bridge, 55 km downstream of the Rajendra Setu, links Jamalpur station on the Sahibganj loop line of Eastern Railway to the Barauni–Katihar section of East Central Railway.

References

External links
Trains at Barauni

5 ft 6 in gauge railways in India
Railway lines in Bihar
Transport in Barauni